Apohaqui is an unincorporated community in Kings County, New Brunswick, Canada. It is located on the Kennebecasis River at the confluence of the Millstream River. Apohaqui straddles the Kennebecasis, which is also the Studholm and Sussex parish boundary.

The name is also used for a special service area and taxing authority within the local service district of the parish of Sussex; the special service area does not extend into Studholm Parish.

The name Apohaqui originates from the Maliseet word Apolog'aneek, and means "The joining of two waters" or "the joining of two rivers".

Apohaqui is also home to the Apohaqui Elementary School, Jones Memorial Park, Apohaqui Community Church, Silas James Memorial Church, and the Atlantic Transport Training Academy.

History

The Mi’kmaq settled in the Maritime region about 2500 years ago. They shared what is now New Brunswick with the Wolastokqiyik (Maliseet), who settled along the Saint John River. The Wolastokqiyik made extensive use of this river system to travel, hunt and fish. It is said that they would cover amazing distances by portaging in their canoes. Unlike the Mi’kmaq, who often moved their camps, the Wolastokqiyik built permanent villages. Here they grew corn, beans and squash. Their closest encampment was in Apohaqui, a neighbouring village of Sussex, NB.
The Maliseet people traveled the Millstream and Kennebecasis Rivers in canoes and lived in the village on the low banks opposite the junction of these rivers. For many years since, others found tools and arrow heads used by the Maliseet people.

Major Studholm, in command of Fort Howe, welcomed the Loyalists in 1783 and helped them settle in Saint John, NB and surrounding areas including Apohaqui.
Major Studholm died in 1792 and was buried in an unmarked grave on a hill in Apohaqui. He had no heirs and it was believed he was quite wealthy. People thought that his money was buried beside his grave and his ghost guards it safely. Treasure-seekers dug in the dead of the night in search of the major's gold but were frightened by the major carrying his treasure on his ghostly horse.

In the early 19th century, Archibald McDonald started the first school in Apohaqui in a room of a house. He opened his school early in the morning and closed at sundown six days a week. In 1868, the first Apohaqui School was built (this building is now a home).

For high school students to go to school, they had to catch the train to Sussex, NB (this train station is now used as an exhibition building at the 8th Hussars arena in Sussex).
In the winter, the students would walk to the school trustee's house to ask for a half-day holiday to go skating. In the summer the children would swim in the river.
Many people in Apohaqui worked at Jones mill.

The original Jones Brothers Store was built in the 1870s but burned in 1893. The fire burned many important buildings in Apohaqui. The Jones Store was rebuilt.

Notable people

It is the hometown of former Premier of New Brunswick, Frank McKenna and former mayor of the city of Saint John, NB, Norm McFarlane.
Apohaqui is located in southern New Brunswick, about 60 kilometers east of Saint John.

See also
List of communities in New Brunswick
 Apohaqui Elementary school
 Apohaqui Community Church
 Atlantic Transport Training Academy

References

http://web1.nbed.nb.ca/sites/ASD-S/1943/Documents/History.pdf
 http://www.sussexmurals.com/index.php?option=com_content&task=view&id=3&Itemid=4

Communities in Kings County, New Brunswick